Forgotten Commandments is a 1932 American pre-Code drama film directed by Louis J. Gasnier and William Schorr and written by James B. Fagan and Agnes Brand Leahy. The film stars Sari Maritza, Gene Raymond, Marguerite Churchill, Irving Pichel, Harry Beresford and Kent Taylor. The film was released on May 22, 1932, by Paramount Pictures.

Overview
The framework story serves as a backdrop to a retelling of the Exodus tale and, more importantly, to the recycling of footage from the silent version of The Ten Commandments.

Cast 
Sari Maritza as Anya Sorina
Gene Raymond as Paul Ossipoff
Marguerite Churchill as Marya Ossipoff
Irving Pichel as Prof. Marinoff
Harry Beresford as Priest
Kent Taylor as Gregor
 Joe Sawyer as Ivan Ivanovitch Petroff
 Edward Van Sloan as Doctor
 William Barrymore as Burly Student 
 Sidney Miller as Student 
 John Carradine as First Orator
 Harry Cording as Officer

References

External links 
 

1932 films
American drama films
1932 drama films
Paramount Pictures films
Films directed by Louis J. Gasnier
American black-and-white films
1930s English-language films
1930s American films